Gene Bates (born 4 July 1981) is an Australian cyclist, last riding for the Drapac Porsche Cycling. Bates is currently the sporting director for UCI Women's team  and has been since 2014.

Career
Bates began his professional career in 2006 with the Italian team LPR Brakes. In 2003 Bates won the  Australian Under 23 road championship, and he joined Crédit Agricole for a period as a stagiaire. This did not lead to a professional contract so he served a further period as a stagiaire for Saeco the following year. In the 2006 Tour Down Under he finished 5th overall. He also put in a strong showing at the Tour de Langkawi, finishing second in a stage behind Laurent Mangel.

After cycling professionally, worked as assistant team manager for Jayco–AIS in 2011. Bates was appointed as head cycling coach at the end of 2011 until 2013 for the Tasmanian Institute of Sport, and for 2012 and 2013 Bates was endurance coach for Cycling Australia's junior track team.

Major results
Sources:

2001
 1st  Youth classification Tour Down Under
2003
 1st  Road race, National Under-23 Road Championships
 1st  Youth classification Tour Down Under
 1st Sprint classification Oberösterreich Rundfahrt
1st Stage 2
 1st Giro delle Due Province 
 7th Coppa della Pace
 8th GP Citta di Felino
2004
 1st Parma La Spezia
 10th Overall Tour Down Under
2005
 1st  Mountain classification Tour Down Under
 1st Piccola Sanremo
 2nd Coppa della Pace
 2nd Giro del Belvedere
 7th Trofeo G. Bianchin
2006
 3rd Gran Piemonte
 5th Overall Tour Down Under
2007
 2nd GP Marmo
 7th Overall Tour Down Under
 8th Overall Tour of Britain
2009
 3rd Halle–Ingooigem

References

External links
 

1981 births
Living people
Australian male cyclists
Cyclists from South Australia